The Telford Steam Railway (TSR) is a heritage railway located at Horsehay, Telford in Shropshire, England, formed in 1976.

The railway is operated by volunteers on Sundays and Bank Holidays from Easter to the end of September, and at Christmas. Its official business name is the Telford Horsehay Steam Trust (THST), and it is a registered charity.

History
Telford Steam Railway operates over a portion of the Wellington and Severn Junction railway (W&SJR). The line to Lightmoor and beyond to Buildwas was constructed by the Wenlock, Craven Arms and Lightmoor Extension railway. Both of these became a part of the Wellington to Craven Arms Railway.

For most of its working life the line was operated by the Great Western Railway and subsequently the Western Region of British Railways.

The line directions between Buildwas and Lightmoor were counter-intuitive for a period when the line going down the hill was the Up Line (towards London), and the line going up the hill was the Down Line (away from London), as the direction towards London from Lightmoor Junction was then considered to be routed via the former Severn Valley line. Since the last change the up direction is now completely intuitive.

Passenger services between Buildwas and Wellington ended on 23 July 1962, pre-dating the publication of the 'Beeching Report' in March 1963.

Locations
 Spring Village station platform 
 Horsehay & Dawley station platform 
 Heath Hill tunnel southern entrance 
 Lawley Village station platform

Current passenger operation
The preserved railway operates between three stations of the former W&SJR.

Horsehay & Dawley platform sits on a north-south through line, beneath Bridge Road. 150 yards to the west, Spring Village platform is at the end of a short spur off the running line. In between the two station platforms are the sidings and yard used for storing the railway's stock. Beyond Spring Village platform is the former goods transhipment shed, built in 1860, which had originally permitted the transfer of goods from the W&SJR to the Coalbrookdale Company's narrow gauge plateway system. The building now serves as the railway's engine shed. At the north end of the line TSR's Lawley Village station is located south of the site of the original Lawley station. That site is now occupied by a commercial development.

TSR's regular passenger timetable consists of a departure from Spring Village north to Lawley Village and then back along the line to stop at Horsehay & Dawley. The train then repeats this journey in reverse, for a round trip taking 50 minutes.

In addition to the standard gauge running line, the railway also operates a short  narrow gauge line adjacent to Horsehay Pool. The Phoenix Model Engineering Society operates a 5" miniature railway on the Spring Village site.

A large model railway and a cafe are situated at Horsehay & Dawley Station.

Expansion

TSR intends to extend south beyond Horsehay & Dawley station to Doseley Halt, build a new bridge over the A4169 and continue to the Ironbridge Gorge passing through Coalbrookdale and eventually onto the power station site at Buildwas. South of Doseley half a mile of trackbed and two missing level crossings separate TSR's current railhead from the A4169 and Lightmoor Junction. Permission was given in June 2014 by Telford and Wrekin Council for trains to operate south to Doseley once all trackworks and building works have been completed. It was expected for work to commence south from Horsehay & Dawley station to Doseley Halt in the summer of 2015.

Although from the road it appears the formation would have to be raised by a prohibitive amount to achieve the statutory headroom below the bridge over the A4169, surveying by THST confirmed that a modest increase in height will provide the necessary clearance without increasing the already steep gradient between Doseley station and Lightmoor Junction. Network Rail have donated a fabricated steel bridge that will be suitable to span the road which arrived at Spring Village in October 2010.

The extension south of Lightmoor is dependent upon TSR securing the redundant half of the former double track from Lightmoor to Buildwas and reinstating the missing portion of the bridge over Brick Kiln Bank. This bridge was previously reduced to a single track width when Network Rail replaced the original double track width brick arch with single track width concrete section.

In October 2006, with the abolition of Lightmoor Junction, Network Rail took the uphill line out of use; the former downhill line becoming a bi-directional extension of the existing single line from Madeley Junction. TSR plans to use the uphill line as its route into the Ironbridge Gorge including extension over Coalbrookdale Viaduct and across the Albert Edward Bridge onto the power station site, at Buildwas, when it closes. TSR intends to reinstate Coalbrookdale station to serve the Ironbridge Gorge Trust's Museum of Iron, Coalbrookdale's original station buildings survive as part of the Green Wood Centre's Woodland Experience site.

In August 2008 Telford Steam Railway concluded negotiations with Network Rail for the lease and occupation of Lightmoor Junction Signal Box. Substantially intact, TSR has begun work to replace components removed by NR and plans to return the box to 1950s conditions. Until it comes into operational use TSR will make it available for group visits and a limited number of open days during the year.

On 16 July 2010 the Shropshire Star published a video interview with Regeneration chief Councillor Eric Carter of Telford and Wrekin Council, in which he discussed proposals by Telford Steam Railway to operate to the site of Ironbridge Power Station after its scheduled closure in 2015.

In 2016, the Telford Steam Railway started their now flagship event of the year, The Polar Express, which is run throughout December. The train normally consisting of a hired S160 Steam locomotive from Churnet Valley Railway, 4 Mk2 Coaches plus a banker locomotive (Normally a Class 08), The event has been a runaway success for the TSR, bringing in the much needed funds for the extensions and to upgrade and improve their current site and rolling stock.

Prior to The Polar Express of 2017, extensive work was carried out on both Horsehay and Dawley station and Spring Village to extend the platforms to take the longer 4 coach train along with a new station building being erected on Horsehay and Dawley platform, this will also help with train lengths when the trains run through from Lawley to Ironbridge which are foreseen to consist of a locomotive and 4 coaches.

As of the beginning of 2019, the track between the station Horsehay and Dawley to the level crossing at Doseley had been removed prior to relaying to passenger carrying standards. In 2019, the Telford Steam Railway had also published its website for "Steaming to Ironbridge" outlining the proposed extension plans for the line into the power station site in Ironbridge, which is very well backed by both Telford and Wrekin and the owners of the power station site, Harworth. The site proposals for the site do include a railway station using the existing railway line.

Stock list

Operational steam locomotives
 Rocket, mainstay of TSR's passenger operations. Built by Peckett and Sons Ltd of Bristol in 1926 to works order no. 1722, Rocket was employed by the Courtaulds Company at Coventry. It remained there throughout its working life and eventually found itself as part of the private "Shropshire Collection", near Shrewsbury. The complete collection was sold to the S & D Co. Ltd, who had Rocket restored to operational status by 2003. Rocket left Horsehay for overhaul at Tyseley Locomotive Works in March 2012, returning to public service in April 2014.

GWR 5600 Class  No 5619 built in 1925. The largest and only ex-main line steam locomotive on the line, 5619 was originally purchased by the Telford Development Corporation from Barry scrapyard for static display at Horsehay goods shed. THST restored the loco to operational condition and it ran at Horsehay and many other preserved lines until its boiler certificate expired in 1991. In 1998 lottery funding was obtained to allow a full overhaul to begin; refurbishment of the frames and fitting of the wheels, cylinders, side tanks and bunker were completed at Horsehay. Boilerwork and final reassembly of the locomotive took place at The Flour Mill workshop, Lydney after further funding was provided by Alan Moore CBE. Returning to traffic after passing its final steam tests, it moved to the Avon Valley Railway for two weeks' running-in in February 2008. After attending TSR's Steam Gala in May 2008, it spent 2 years on hire at the Gloucestershire Warwickshire Railway, moving to the North Norfolk Railway in March 2010. Was on hire to the Midland Railway - Butterley from October 2016 until late 2017 and then went on hire to the Nene Valley Railway from February 2018. Was then on hire to the Swindon and Cricklade Railway from 2019 to late 2020. It spent its next hire period until late 2021 at the Epping Ongar Railway, before returning to the Telford Steam Railway to operate the Polar Express trains for that year. Following this, it went out on hire once more to the Llangollen Railway for their 2022 season, after having maintenance carried out at their MPD.

Hired steam locomotives
 Merlin, On hire to complement Rocket and to take some of the strain during the running season. Has been with the TSR since 2017 and is due to leave shortly
USATC S160 no. 5197. Has been hired in for the Polar Express season from the Churnet Valley Railway in the past. Sister locomotive no. 6046 operated the first season in 2016.

Stored steam locomotives

Peckett and Sons  No 1990, Ironbridge No 3, built in 1940. Employed by the West Midlands Joint Electricity Authority's power station at Ironbridge, it remained there throughout its working life until retired in 1980, when it was sold to the Steamport Museum at Southport. Purchased by TSR in 1984 and restored to working order at Horsehay, it now requires a new firebox and boiler overhaul.
Hawthorn Leslie  No 3240 Beatty built in 1917. Partially dismantled for restoration.
Barclay  No. 1944 Fireless locomotive, Currently cosmetically restored and on a piece of disconnected track in the yard. This loco worked for Colmans Mustard and ended operations at Croda Synthetic Chemical Works Ltd, Four Ashes, Staffordshire.

Operational diesel multiple units
British Rail Class 108 No. 51950 (DMBS) and No 52062 (DMCL), both in chocolate and cream with yellow ends. Privately owned. Formerly stored at the Gloucestershire & Warwickshire Railway, the pair moved to Horsehay in July 2012.
British Rail Class 142 No. 142004 (DMS 55545 and DMSL 55595), both in unbranded Northern Rail livery. Privately owned and currently awaiting an announcement of future plans. The unit arrived in April 2021.
British Rail Class 142 No. 142058 (DMS 55708 and DMSL 55754), both in unbranded Northern Rail livery. The unit arrived in April 2021.
British Rail Class 144 No. 144013 (DMS 55817 and DMSL 55836), both in unbranded Northern Rail livery. From Porterbrook leasing, the unit arrived in July 2020.

Operational diesel locomotives
British Rail Class 08 No 08757 Eagle In RES livery.
British Rail Class 37 (Privately owned) No 37263 now fully operational and looking very smart in it new Departmental Grey livery
North British  (Privately owned) No. 27414 Tom In BR Black livery. Tom has been at the TSR since the 1980s where it was donated from GKN Sankey in Hadley and is now in private ownership. 
Ruston & Hornsby  (Privately owned) Class 165DS No. 313394 Jammo in BR Green livery. This locomotive upon arrival at the TSR has been fitted with Vacuum brake system so that she can be used for passenger service. 
Ruston & Hornsby  (Privately owned)Class 88DS Hector Now having in depth restoration/mechanical overhual after a change in ownership, Hector has been outshopped in a Prussian blue livery with yellow lining. Hector is hoped to be back in service soon.
Ruston & Hornsby  No. 525947 Rusty Arriving at the TSR in 1995, 'Rusty' was bought from Blue Circle Industrials Ltd at Kirton Lindsey, Lincolnshire. Now carrying BR Blue livery. This locomotive is used for shunting stock around in the yard, p-way trains and can also be found on passenger services.

Non-operational diesel locomotives
Ruston & Hornsby  (Privately owned) No 183062 Folly Currently stripped down undergoing extensive long-term restoration.

Notable rolling stock
1961 BR Mk 1 coach No. SC 14901. Originally built at Swindon as a standard compartment first, it was converted by BR into a prototype 1st Class Lounge Car as part of a project to produce stock to specifications formerly associated with Pullman services. Four of the conventional compartments were removed and replaced by two comfortable lounges, each seating ten passengers. As of April 2014 the coach is undergoing refurbishment for further passenger use. Currently, the newly arrived Mk2 stock has taken priority to be restored to use.

Operational 2' narrow gauge locomotives
Alan Keef Ltd  Steam Tram. The Telford Steam Railway's steam tram once ran along the side of the lake in Telford Town Park. Starting from the amphitheatre, the railway did not last very long and was relocated to the Telford Steam Railway in the mid-1980s, where it is still running today around a circular track around the railway's yard near Horsehay Pool.

See also 

 Telford steam tram

References

Further reading
 The Wenlock Branch – Wellington to Craven Arms, Ken Jones, Oakwood Press 1998,

External links

Telford Steam Railway – official website
Phoenix Model Engineering Society Website

Heritage railways in Shropshire
Telford
Railway companies established in 1976
Charities based in Shropshire
1976 establishments in England
British companies established in 1976